Two ships have been named PS Duchess of Fife:

  launched in 1899 and scrapped in 1929
  launched in 1903 and scrapped in 1953

Ship names